Krasimir Videnov (born 15 June 1968) is a Bulgarian biathlete. He competed at the 1988 Winter Olympics, the 1992 Winter Olympics and the 1994 Winter Olympics.

References

External links
 

1968 births
Living people
Bulgarian male biathletes
Olympic biathletes of Bulgaria
Biathletes at the 1988 Winter Olympics
Biathletes at the 1992 Winter Olympics
Biathletes at the 1994 Winter Olympics
People from Samokov
Sportspeople from Sofia Province
20th-century Bulgarian people
21st-century Bulgarian people